Nikola Iliyanov Iliev (born 6 June 2004) is a Bulgarian footballer who plays as an attacking midfielder and forward for Serie A club Inter Milan and the Bulgaria national team. He was included in The Guardian "Next Generation" list for 2021.

Career
Born in Yudelnik, Slivo Pole Municipality, Iliev began his football career at Botev Plovdiv. He made his professional debut for the team in a league match against Slavia Sofia on 29 September 2019. In June 2020, he completed his move to Inter Milan, signing a 4-year contract.

On 31 May 2022, Iliev scored the winning goal for Inter U19 against Roma U19, making Inter Serie A Primavera champions.

On 26 October 2022, he scored all 4 goals in Inter's 4–2 win against Viktoria Plzeň in the UEFA Youth League.

On 5 February 2023, he was announced as Bulgarian Youth Footballer of 2022.

International career
Iliev received his first call-up for the Bulgaria senior national team on 5 September 2022, for the UEFA Nations League games against Gibraltar and North Macedonia on 23 and 26 September 2022. He made his debut in the match against Gibraltar, won 5–1 by Bulgaria.

Career statistics

Club

Notes

International

Honours

Individual
 Bulgarian Youth Footballer of the Year: 2022

References

2004 births
Living people
People from Rousse Province
Bulgarian footballers
Bulgaria youth international footballers
Association football forwards
First Professional Football League (Bulgaria) players
Botev Plovdiv players
Inter Milan players
Bulgarian expatriate footballers
Bulgarian expatriate sportspeople in Italy
Expatriate footballers in Italy